Benhamipolynoe cairnsi is known from the south-west Pacific Ocean from depths of about 400–500m

Description
Benhamipolynoe cairnsi has 10 pairs of elytra (fewer than Benhamipolynoe antipathicola) and the preserved specimens studied thus far are not known to be pigmented.

Biology and Ecology
Benhamipolynoe cairnsi has a commensal relationship with the stylasterid coral Conopora adeta.

References

Phyllodocida